Lake Charm is a small town situated on the Murray Valley Highway, just west of a lake of the same name. Located in the northwest of Victoria, Australia, within the Shire of Gannawarra. Lake Charm is 19 km from Kerang.

The area is a popular destination for waterskiing, boating, duck hunting, fishing and scenic drives. It is south of Swan Hill, the nearest large town.

Lakes
Lake Charm has a surface area of 457 hectares and is especially noted for its large redfin.

Just north of Lake Charm is Racecourse Lake, which is a good fishing spot with picnic facilities.

Sport
The Lake Charm Football club combined with Mystic Park Football Club in the early 1950s becoming the Lakes Football Club, and were a member of the Kerang and District Football League, the club went into recess following the 1985 season.
Lakes as the team was known to its followers won the KDFL 1966 under 16 competition premiership and they took out the premiership at Senior level in 1972.
Lake Charm once had a small golf course .
There is a Tennis Club at Lake Charm and it is still active.
The Lake Charm cricket team played in the North West Lakes Cricket association both ceased in the early 1970s.
Other popular sports at Lake Charm are water skiing, sailing and fishing.

Railway
Just south of town is the Yungera railway line. The train does not stop, with the station closing to all traffic on 31 July 1977.

References

Towns in Victoria (Australia)